The Inalienable Dreamless is the third and final studio album by grindcore band Discordance Axis, released on Hydra Head Records on August 13, 2000. It has since become one of the most acclaimed grindcore albums of all time. The album, along with its production history, was made the subject of the 2012 book Compiling Autumn: The Making of Discordance Axis' "The Inalienable Dreamless", a limited edition paperback that was released to aid the Japanese Red Cross Society. The album was repressed on black and blue vinyl for Record Store Day in 2011.

Many of the tracks refer to elements from the anime/manga franchise Neon Genesis Evangelion, including "Angel Present", "Pattern Blue", "The End of Rebirth", and "The Third Children".

Background and production
After the release of the 1997 album Jouhou, guitarist Rob Marton left the band right before they could start their Japanese tour, citing schedule conflicts with his job as a main reason. To fill in his place, the band hired guitarist Steve Procopio for the tour. The band would then take a two year hiatus before reforming in 1999 to work on new material, Marton now back in the band. The trio was then offered by Hydra Head Records after label head Aaron Turner listened to Jouhou.

The Inalienable Dreamless was recorded, mixed, and mastered in four days during late 1999 at Trax East. Originally, Steve Evetts was to engineer the record, however he quit and left the studio before the band could start the sessions, so Jon D'Uva was hired last minute to replace him. During the sessions, D'Uva added a subharmonic bass synthesizer effect to the guitar recordings, giving the recordings a more "full" sound. The album was released in August 2000 on compact disc and vinyl formats.

Artwork, packaging, and lyrics
The CD edition of the album was packaged in a keep case, which is normally associated with DVDs. The booklet included with the CD release includes lyrics in unique handwritten fonts displayed over pictures of the oceanside taken by photographer Scott Kinkade. The photos were taken out at Sea Bright, New Jersey, which was where drummer Dave Witte was living during the production of the album. Kinkade was hired to take the photos because he had been friends with the band ever since they met each other at a show in 1996. The LP edition of the album too featured the booklet, and was pressed on black and clear vinyl. The clear edition was a pressing of only 100 copies. All LP editions featured etchings in the run-out grooves that read "Are You My Pal...Danny?"

Lyrical themes of the album include loneliness and despair, a departure from the group's earlier politically motivated works. The lyrics also include references to, and were heavily inspired by, the anime series Neon Genesis Evangelion, in particular the films Neon Genesis Evangelion: Death & Rebirth and End of Evangelion. Authors Philip K. Dick and Joseph Conrad are referenced as well.

Reception and legacy
Since its initial release, the album has received critical acclaim from critics, and is considered by many to be one of the best modern grindcore albums ever made. In 2009, Decibel magazine included the album in its "Hall of Fame" list. William York of AllMusic awarded the album a near perfect score of 4.5 out of 5 and "Recommended Pick" status, praising the band's musicianship. Greg Patt of Brave Words gave the album a perfect 10/10 score, complimenting the "painfully emotional and poetic" lyrics and Dave Witte's drumming. Stylus Magazine writer Clay Jarvis rated the album with an A score.

Track listing

Personnel
Discordance Axis
Jon Chang - vocals
Rob Marton - guitars
Dave Witte - drums

Production
Jon D'Uva - engineering, recording
Scott Kinkade - photography

References

External links 
 
 

2000 albums
Hydra Head Records albums
Discordance Axis albums